Carotenoid isomerooxygenase (ninaB (gene)) is an enzyme with systematic name zeaxanthin:oxygen 15,15'-oxidoreductase (bond-cleaving, cis-isomerizing). This enzyme catalyses the following chemical reaction

 zeaxanthin + O2  (3R)-11-cis-3-hydroxyretinal + (3R)-all-trans-3-hydroxyretinal

The enzyme from the moth Galleria mellonella and the fruit fly Drosophila melanogaster takes part in the synthesis of retinal .

References

External links 
 

EC 1.13.11